Alroy Downs Station is a pastoral lease that operates as a cattle station in Northern Territory.

Location
Located on the Barkly Tableland a portion of the Playford River flows also through the station as does a portion of Buchanan Creek. It shares a boundary with Brunette Downs Station to the north, Rockhampton Downs to the west, Dalmore Downs to the south and Alexandria Station to the east. The Tablelands Highway bisects the property.

Description
The landscape consists of clay plains of various origins that support stands of Mitchell and other annual grasses. The southern areas are more lateritic in origin with the red coloured earth of the outback. Drainage areas, Coolibah swampland and areas of bluebush are found in the north of the property.
 

History
Alroy Downs was founded on Yindjilandji tribal lands. The lease was first granted in 1877 with the property being established in 1878 by W.Lamb. It was later acquired by the J. C. Schmidt in 1914 who appointed F. Story to manage the property. Schmidt's son Rudolf ran the property from 1934 to 1936 and remained in the family most recently run by Trevor Schmidt who was also the managing Director of the Australian Agricultural Company from 1974 to 1988.

The property was acquired by the Stanbroke Pastoral Company in 1984.

Peter Sherwin bought Alroy Downs in 2004 for 30 million in the Stanbroke sell-off and sold it in 2008 for 70 million. The property was in the grips of a drought it was sold. The purchaser was Sterling Buntine.

See also
List of ranches and stations
List of the largest stations in Australia

References

 
Pastoral leases in the Northern Territory 
Stations (Australian agriculture)
1877 establishments in Australia